The Shadow Between is a 1931 British romantic drama film directed by Norman Walker and starring Godfrey Tearle, Kathleen O'Regan, Olga Lindo and Ann Casson. It was produced by British International Pictures and shot at the company's Elstree Studios outside London.

Cast
 Godfrey Tearle as Paul Haddon  
 Kathleen O'Regan as Margaret Haddon  
 Olga Lindo as Nell Baker  
 Ann Casson as Betty Fielder  
 Haddon Mason as Philip  
 Mary Jerrold as Mrs. Maddox  
 Hubert Harben as Reverend Simon Maddox  
 Henry Wenman as Sergeant Blake  
 Henry Caine as Wincher  
 Morton Selten as Sir George Fielder  
 Arthur Chesney as Pug Wilson  
 Jerrold Robertshaw as Mr. Haddon

References

Bibliography
 Low, Rachael. Filmmaking in 1930s Britain. George Allen & Unwin, 1985.
Wood, Linda. British Films, 1927–1939. British Film Institute, 1986.

External links

1931 films
Films shot at British International Pictures Studios
1931 romantic drama films
1930s English-language films
British romantic drama films
British black-and-white films
1930s British films